Sri Subramanya Temple is a Hindu temple located in Munnar in Idukki district in the Indian state of Kerala. Lord Muruga is the principal deity.

Poojas 
Three poojas are held every day including 'Usha pooja' in morning section, 'Ucha pooja' in noon section and 'Attazha pooja' in desk section.

Festivals 
The annual festival 'Thrikarthika' is hosted in the Malayalam month of Vrischikam (i.e. November to December). Uthram asterism day in Meenam (i.e. March to April) is also an important festival.

Temple 
This temple located on a small hill was worshipped by the Muthuvan tribal community in the past. Later it was closed for a long time. But seeing the pathetic condition, the temple was renovated by the members of Travancore royal family when they came to visit Munnar during the summer season. Earlier Nambudiris held the tantric rights of the temple. At present the rights are held by local Tamil Brahmins. The temple is now administered by a committee of local Hindus.

References 

Hindu temples in Idukki district
Murugan temples in Kerala